Espyville is an unincorporated community in Big Island Township, Marion County, Ohio, United States.

The Espyville Post Office was established on June 10, 1884, and discontinued on May 31, 1910. Mail service is now handled through the Marion branch.

References

Unincorporated communities in Marion County, Ohio